Jonathan Alexis Sandoval Rojas (born 25 June 1987) is a Uruguayan professional footballer who plays as a right-back for Argentine Primera División side Atlético Tucumán, on loan from Argentinos Juniors.

Career
Sandoval's senior career began in 2006 with Uruguayan Primera División side River Plate. He made fourteen appearances before being loaned out to Liga Nacional de Fútbol de Guatemala club Heredia. He failed to make an appearance prior to returning to River Plate. In 2008, Sandoval joined Sud América of the Uruguayan Segunda División on loan. He scored six times in thirteen appearances. 2009 saw Sandoval loaned out twice to Primera División club Cerro Largo and Segunda División club Rentistas. In total, for both, he made twenty-one appearances and scored twice. He made two final appearances for River Plate in 2010–11.

On 23 January 2011, Sandoval completed a permanent transfer to Montevideo Wanderers. He made his league debut on 5 February versus Nacional, while he scored his first two goals for Montevideo against El Tanque Sisley on 3 April. In three seasons with the team, Sandoval scored eight goals in sixty matches. He joined Peñarol in 2013 and made his debut against his former club, River Plate, in August. After twenty-two apps for Peñarol, Sandoval had a short spell with Liverpool in 2016 before joining Primera B Nacional side Argentinos Juniors later that year.

He scored on his Argentinos debut, getting their second goal in a 2–2 draw with San Martín. In that season, Sandoval participated in thirty Primera B Nacional fixtures and scored three goals as Argentinos won promotion to the Argentine Primera División by winning the 2016–17 title. He made his 200th career appearance on 26 February 2018 during a 2–0 loss against Talleres.

In January 2022, Sandoval was loaned out to Colón from Argentinos Juniors until the end of the year. However, the loan was cut short and Sandoval was instead loaned out to Atlético Tucumán on 12 June 2022, until the end of the year.

Career statistics
.

Honours
Peñarol
Uruguayan Primera División: 2015–16

Argentinos Juniors
Primera B Nacional: 2016–17

References

External links

1987 births
Living people
Footballers from Montevideo
Uruguayan footballers
Uruguayan expatriate footballers
Association football defenders
Uruguayan Primera División players
Uruguayan Segunda División players
Primera Nacional players
Argentine Primera División players
Club Atlético River Plate (Montevideo) players
Heredia Jaguares de Peten players
Sud América players
Cerro Largo F.C. players
Rentistas players
Montevideo Wanderers F.C. players
Peñarol players
Liverpool F.C. (Montevideo) players
Argentinos Juniors footballers
Club Atlético Colón footballers
Atlético Tucumán footballers
Uruguayan expatriate sportspeople in Guatemala
Uruguayan expatriate sportspeople in Argentina
Expatriate footballers in Guatemala
Expatriate footballers in Argentina